Aleksandr Viktorovich Skrynnikov (born January 19, 1960) is a Russian professional football coach and a former player.

External links
 Career summary at KLISF

Soviet footballers
Russian footballers
FC Elista players
Soviet football managers
Russian football managers
FC Elista managers
Russian Premier League managers
FC Volgar Astrakhan managers
1960 births
Living people
Association football defenders
FC Rotor Volgograd players